Isabella Miller may refer to:

Isabella Miller (barrel racer) (1941–2007),  champion Canadian equestrian and rodeo participant
Isabella Miller (née Taves, 1905–2005), Hollywood fashion editor at Screen & Radio Weekly
Isabella Johnston (née Miller, 1891–1976), Australian activist